Carl Huisken (30 July 1902, in Amsterdam – 25 June 1987, in Putten) was a sailor from the Netherlands, who represented his native country at the 1928 Summer Olympics in Amsterdam. Huisken, as crew member on the Dutch 6 Metre Kemphaan, took the 4th place with helmsman Hans Pluijgers and fellow crew members: Hans Fokker, Wim Schouten and Roeffie Vermeulen.

Sources
 
 
 

1902 births
1987 deaths
Sportspeople from Amsterdam
Dutch male sailors (sport)
Sailors at the 1928 Summer Olympics – 6 Metre
Olympic sailors of the Netherlands
20th-century Dutch people